The 630s decade ran from January 1, 630, to December 31, 639.

Significant people
 Abu Bakr
 Ali
 Khalid ibn al-Walid
 Muhammad
 Queen Seondeok of Silla
 Yazdegerd III

References

Sources

 Akram, Agha Ibrahim The Sword of Allah: